Martín Andrés Posse Paz (born 2 August 1975) is an Argentine retired footballer who played mainly as a forward, and is a manager.

Club career
Born in San Justo, Buenos Aires, Posse began his professional career with Club Atlético Vélez Sarsfield, being part of its successful teams in the mid-1990s and making over 100 appearances in all competitions. He helped the club to three top division titles and four international tournaments, including the 1994 Copa Libertadores.

Posse joined Spanish side RCD Espanyol in 1999, going on to become one of the club's most important offensive elements in the subsequent La Liga seasons, although never an undisputed starter. After a successful loan at CD Tenerife in the second level he returned to Catalonia, but only amassed 11 appearances in two campaigns combined.

International career
In 1997, Posse was selected for the Argentina squad to play in that year's Copa América, going on to collect three caps.

Coaching career
Posse retired in late 2007 at the age of 32, after brief spells in the Spanish lower leagues with UE Figueres and UE Castelldefels, both in the Barcelona area. As a manager, he worked with Espanyol's youths in several capacities, and had his first senior appointment with neighbouring CE L'Hospitalet, in division three. He resigned on 13 October.

On 29 June 2014 Posse was appointed at CF Pobla de Mafumet, Gimnàstic de Tarragona's farm team.

In July 2018, Posse was hired as a youth coach at CF Damm. He was there until 7 February 2019, where he was hired as the assistant manager of Patricio Camps at Independiente Santa Fe.

Honours

Club
 Vélez Sarsfield
Copa Libertadores: 1994
Intercontinental Cup: 1994
Argentine Primera División: Apertura 1995, Clausura 1996, Clausura 1998
Copa Interamericana: 1995
Supercopa Sudamericana: 1996
Recopa Sudamericana: 1997

 Espanyol
Copa del Rey: 1999–2000, 2005–06

References

External links
 Argentine League statistics at Fútbol XXI  
 
 
 El Mundo profile 
 
 

1975 births
Living people
Sportspeople from Buenos Aires Province
Argentine footballers
Association football forwards
Argentine Primera División players
Club Atlético Vélez Sarsfield footballers
La Liga players
Segunda División players
Segunda División B players
RCD Espanyol footballers
CD Tenerife players
UE Figueres footballers
UE Vilajuïga footballers
Argentina international footballers
1997 Copa América players
Argentine expatriate footballers
Expatriate footballers in Spain
Argentine expatriate sportspeople in Spain
Argentine football managers
CE L'Hospitalet managers
CF Pobla de Mafumet managers
UE Olot managers
Expatriate football managers in Spain